Luke Anthony John O'Neill  is professor of biochemistry in the School of Biochemistry and Immunology at Trinity College Dublin.

Education
O'Neill was educated at Trinity College Dublin where he was awarded an undergraduate degree in Natural Sciences (Biochemistry) in 1985. He completed his postgraduate study at the University of London where he was awarded a PhD in Pharmacology for the research investigating the characterisation of interleukin-1-induced prostaglandin E₂ release in human synovial cells in 1988. Following his PhD, he was a postdoctoral researcher at the Strangeways Research Laboratory in Cambridge funded by the Medical Research Council (MRC).

Research
O'Neill's research investigates inflammation, a highly complex process that is provoked in the body during infection by bacteria and viruses but also in response to major trauma and injury.  Inflammation restores us to health but for largely unknown reasons it can go rogue and give rise to a whole range of inflammatory diseases which remain difficult to treat.

He has worked on the innate immune system, which lies at the heart of inflammation. He has uncovered new molecules and biochemical processes that are triggered by sensors of infection and tissue injury, including the toll-like receptors and inflammasomes, and the signals they drive that stimulate inflammation, notably cytokines in the interleukin-1 family. He has made pioneering discoveries in the area of metabolic reprogramming in immunity and immunometabolism. He is using his findings to help in the effort to develop novel anti-inflammatory medicines. He has co-founded Inflazome with Matt Cooper which developed NLRP3 inhibitors and was acquired by Roche Ltd in 2020, and Sitryx with Houman Ashrafian, Johnathan Powell, Jeff Rathmell and Mike Rosenblum.

In 2023 he was appointed Chief Scientific Officer of Senda Biosciences, a company pioneering programmable medicines (https://www.sendabiosciences.com).

His research has been funded by the Science Foundation Ireland (SFI), the European Research Council (ERC), the Wellcome Trust and GlaxoSmithKline.

Awards and honours
O'Neill was awarded the Royal Dublin Society & The Irish Times Robert Boyle Medal for scientific excellence in 2009, the Royal Irish Academy Gold Medal for Life Sciences in 2012 and the European Federation of Immunology Societies (EFIS) Medal in 2014. He was elected a member of the Royal Irish Academy (MRIA) in 2004 and the European Molecular Biology Organisation (EMBO) in 2005. O'Neill was elected a Fellow of the Royal Society (FRS) in 2016.

In 2019 he won the Landsteiner Award from the Austrian Academy of Sciences. In 2021 he won the UCD Biological Society George Sigerson Award for Inspiring Aspiring Scientists.

In 2022, he was made an honorary Doctor of Science by the University of Bath and was presented with an honorary lifetime membership award by the International Cytokine and Interferon Society (https://cytokinesociety.org/luke-oneill-2022/?amp=1).

In 2023 he was appointed to the governing body of the European Research Council, the European Union's premier funder of fundamental research (https://ireland.representation.ec.europa.eu/news-and-events/news/professor-luke-oneill-appointed-governing-body-european-research-council-2022-12-07_en).

Public engagement
O'Neill has a passion to engage with the general public on scientific topics. He has a weekly science slot with Pat Kenny on the Irish national radio station Newstalk. In 2018, he published Humanology: A Scientist's Guide to our Amazing Existence with Gill publishers. In 2019, he published a science book for children, The Great Irish Science Book with Gill. From 2020 onwards, he wrote for the Sunday Independent concerning the COVID-19 pandemic in the Republic of Ireland. He contracted COVID-19 himself in December 2021, and experienced symptoms.

In 2020 he won the An Post Irish Book of the Year Award for best popular non-fiction book  for ‘Never Mind the B*ll*cks Here’s the Science’, published by Gill which was a best seller. He also won the Science Foundation Ireland Science Communicator of the Year Award, for his media work on COVID19.

In 2021 he published 'Keep Calm and Trust the Science- a remarkable year in the Life of an Immunologist' with Gill publishers, which is his diary covering the COVID19 pandemic.

References

Living people
Fellows of the Royal Society
Members of the European Molecular Biology Organization
Members of the Royal Irish Academy
Sunday Independent (Ireland) people
Year of birth missing (living people)